Pleasant Ridge Township is a township in Lee County, Iowa, United States.

History
Pleasant Ridge Township was organized in 1841.

References

Townships in Lee County, Iowa
Townships in Iowa